Polly, sometimes called Polly Wright in spin-off material, is a fictional character played by Anneke Wills in the long-running British science fiction television series Doctor Who. She is a young woman from the year 1966 and was a companion of the First and Second Doctors. Polly was a regular in the television program from 1966 to 1967. Polly appeared in 9 stories (36 episodes). The only serial featuring Polly which is currently complete in the BBC archive is her first, The War Machines.

Appearances

Television
Polly first appeared in the First Doctor serial, The War Machines, where she plays the role of Professor Brett's secretary. Brett develops the artificial intelligence known as WOTAN, and Polly meets the Doctor (William Hartnell) and Dodo (Jackie Lane) when they come to investigate it. Polly befriends Dodo and takes her to a London nightclub called the Inferno, where they meet Ben Jackson (Michael Craze) and try to cheer up the Royal Navy sailor. When Polly is accosted by another patron in the Inferno, Ben comes to her rescue. Eventually, Ben and Polly aid the Doctor in his fight against WOTAN when the computer tries to take over the world. Ben and Polly inform the Doctor of Dodo's decision to stay in 1966, and accidentally get carried away in the TARDIS when they try to return Dodo's key to the time machine.

Polly, in contrast to Dodo, is a more sophisticated and hip young woman of the 1960s — vivacious, attractive, and alternately shy and aggressive. She and Ben make an odd couple but she is receptive to Ben's protective urges, and he in turn finds her elegant and posh, giving her the nickname "Duchess". Polly is present with Ben when the Doctor regenerates for the first time into a new form (Patrick Troughton), and they continue to travel with him. In The Highlanders (1966–67), Polly and Ben are joined on the TARDIS by Jamie McCrimmon (Frazer Hines). Eventually, the TARDIS finds its way back to 1966 London (in The Faceless Ones) on the very day Ben and Polly had left (although about a year had passed for them). They decide to remain behind to resume their lives without disruption as the Doctor and Jamie travel on.

Polly was never given a last name in the series. According to production notes, she was meant to be Polly Wright, but this was not used in case it would be confused with earlier companion Barbara Wright. In The Faceless Ones, a double of Polly is named Michelle Leuppi; an apparent mishearing of this and misinterpretation of the context led to some reference works giving Polly the last name of "Lopez". Anneke Wills suggested the name "Bettingham-Smith", after one of her friends. In the Virgin Missing Adventures novel Invasion of the Cat-People by Gary Russell, Wright is expressly given as Polly's last name, as it was supposedly given in Gerry Davis's character breakdown and audition script sample when, as story editor, he and producer Innes Lloyd created Ben and Polly in 1966.

What happens to Polly after her return to Earth is not certain. The Doctor seems to think that Ben will become an Admiral and that Polly will look after Ben, but it is unclear if this is a prediction or simply wishing them well. In The Sarah Jane Adventures story Death of the Doctor (2010), Sarah Jane mentions that Polly is now working at an orphanage in India with Ben.

On 23 July 2017, the first trailer for the 2017 Christmas special episode, "Twice Upon a Time", was shown during the 2017 San Diego Comic-Con, revealing the return of Polly alongside David Bradley as the First Doctor. She was portrayed by Lily Travers.

Other media
In the spin-off short story "Mondas Passing" by Paul Grice (in the anthology Short Trips) which takes place in 1986, it is revealed that Ben and Polly have gone their separate ways and married other people.While in the short story "That Time I Nearly Destroyed The World Whilst Looking For a Dress" by Joseph Lidster (in the Big Finish Productions anthology Short Trips: Past Tense), it is shown that by 1999 Polly is divorced and has an estranged son named Mikey. However, She and Ben meet again at the end of that story and admit their love for each other.

List of appearances

Television
Season 3
The War Machines
Season 4
The Smugglers
The Tenth Planet
The Power of the Daleks (Episodes 1–3, 5–6)
The Highlanders
The Underwater Menace
The Moonbase
The Macra Terror
The Faceless Ones (Episodes 1, 2, & 6)
Series 10
"Twice Upon a Time"

Novels
Virgin Missing Adventures
Invasion of the Cat-People by Gary Russell

Past Doctor Adventures
The Murder Game by Steve Lyons
The Roundheads by Mark Gatiss
Dying in the Sun by Jon de Burgh Miller
Ten Little Aliens by Stephen Cole

Telos Doctor Who novellas
Wonderland by Mark Chadbourn

Short stories
"Mondas Passing" by Paul Grice (Short Trips)
"That Time I Nearly Destroyed the World Whilst Looking For a Dress" by Joseph Lidster (Short Trips: Past Tense)
"Pluto" by Dale Smith (Short Trips: The Solar System)
"Do You Dream in Colour" by Gary Russell (Short Trips: The Ghosts of Christmas)
"The Slave War" by Una McCormack (Short Trips: The Quality of Leadership)

Comics
"The Tests of Trefus" by David Brian (Doctor Who Annual 1968)
"World Without Night" by David Brian (Doctor Who Annual 1968)
"Food for Thought" by Nicholas Briggs and Colin Andrew (Doctor Who Magazine 218–220)

Audios
Resistance
The Three Companions
The Forbidden Time
The Five Companions (with the Fifth Doctor)
The Selachian Gambit
The House of Cards
The Light at the End (cameo)
The Yes Men
The Forsaken
Lost and Found
The Mouthless Dead
Falling
The Bonfires of the Vanities
The Plague of Dreams
The Night Witches
The Outliers
The Morton Legacy

References

External links

 Polly on the BBC's Doctor Who website

Television characters introduced in 1966
Polly
Female characters in television
Polly
Fictional secretaries